The 1978 Belgian motorcycle Grand Prix was the seventh round of the 1978 Grand Prix motorcycle racing season. It took place on 2 July 1978 at the Circuit de Spa-Francorchamps. These races, along with the Spa 24 Hours touring car race 3 weeks later were the last international major events held on the old 14 kilometer Spa-Francorchamps circuit.

500 cc classification

250 cc classification

125 cc classification

50 cc classification

Sidecar classification

References

Belgian motorcycle Grand Prix
Belgian
Motorcycle Grand Prix